The Wiregrass region, also known as the Wiregrass plains or Wiregrass country, is an area of the Southern United States encompassing parts of southern Georgia, southeastern Alabama, and the Florida Panhandle.  The region is named for the native Aristida stricta, commonly known as wiregrass due to its texture.

Geography
The region stretches approximately from just below Macon, Georgia and follows the Fall Line west to Montgomery, Alabama. From there it turns south and runs to approximately Washington County, Florida in the northern panhandle.  From there it runs east, roughly making its southern boundary along Interstate 10 to Lake City, Florida. From there it turns north, roughly following the Suwannee River back into Georgia and along the western fringes of the Okefenokee Swamp. From here it runs due north back to Macon.

Major highways
Interstate 75, Interstate 10, U.S. Route 231, U.S. Route 331, and portions of Interstate 65 traverse parts of the Wiregrass.  The portion of U.S. Route 84 through Georgia is known as the Wiregrass Georgia Parkway.

Major cities
Major cities in the region include:

Abbeville, Alabama
Abbeville, Georgia
Albany, Georgia
Americus, Georgia
Bainbridge, Georgia
Baxley, Georgia
Cordele, Georgia
Daleville, Alabama
Donalsonville, Georgia
Dothan, Alabama
Douglas, Georgia
Enterprise, Alabama
Eufaula, Alabama
Fitzgerald, Georgia
Geneva, Alabama
Homerville, Georgia
Jasper, Florida
Lake City, Florida
Live Oak, Florida
Luverne, Alabama
Madison, Florida
Monticello, Florida
Marianna, Florida
Moultrie, Georgia
Nashville, Georgia
Ocilla, Georgia
Opp, Alabama
Ozark, Alabama
Panama City, Florida
Perry, Florida
Tallahassee, Florida
Thomasville, Georgia
Tifton, Georgia
Troy, Alabama
Valdosta, Georgia
Waycross, Georgia
White Springs, Florida

Military bases
The region includes Fort Rucker, a U.S. Army post located mostly in Dale County, Alabama.  The post is the primary flight training base for Army Aviation and is home to the United States Army Aviation Center of Excellence (USAACE) and the United States Army Aviation Museum, as well as Moody Air Force Base located in Lowndes and Lanier County, Georgia. Moody AFB is the home of the 23rd Wing. The wing executes worldwide close air support, force protection, and combat search and rescue operations (CSAR) in support of humanitarian interests, United States national security and the global war on terrorism (GWOT).

Waterways
There are two major waterways in the region, and they bisect the Wiregrass, dividing it into three portions.  The Chattahoochee River and the Flint River join to form the Apalachicola River, which flows south from Bainbridge, Georgia and Lake Seminole to the Gulf of Mexico at Apalachicola, Florida. Other waterways include Little Choctawhatchee River, Choctawhatchee River, and Choctawhatchee Bay.

Weather
Due to its proximity to the Gulf of Mexico, the Wiregrass region experiences high heat and humidity in the summers, and has mostly mild winters. The area is prone to hurricanes and tropical storms, most notably Hurricane Michael which highly impacted the area during its landfall in October 2018.

Representation in other media
Harper's Magazine published a poem by Charles Ghigna in September 1974 describing the Wiregrass Region; it is titled "The Alabama Wiregrassers."

References

External links
 Review of A Wiregrass Witness
 WiregrassLive.com - Citizen-driven news and messages
 Wiregrass Weather

Regions of Alabama
Regions of Florida
Regions of Georgia (U.S. state)